Francis "Pop" Vine (1 October 1904 – 6 October 1960) was an Australian rules footballer who played with Melbourne in the Victorian Football League (VFL).

Vine is one of just four players in VFL/AFL history to play in a premiership on debut, along with Bill James, George Rawle and Marlion Pickett. He had been called up, to play the 1926 VFL Grand Final, as a replacement player for Bob Corbett. A centre half-back, Vine was club captain in 1932 and 1933.

References

External links

 
 

1904 births
1960 deaths
Australian rules footballers from Victoria (Australia)
VFL/AFL Players who played their first game in a Grand Final
Melbourne Football Club players
Old Melburnians Football Club players
Melbourne Football Club Premiership players
One-time VFL/AFL Premiership players